Cédric Fauré (born 14 February 1979) is a French former professional footballer who played as a striker. He is currently head-coach of Union Namur in Belgium.

Career

As a player 
Born in Toulouse and raised in the Haute-Garonne village Miremont, Fauré played amateur football and worked for a consumer electronics company before making his professional debut with Toulouse FC in 2002. In his first season, he scored 20 goals which made him Ligue 2 top scorer, helping his club win the league and achieve promotion to Ligue 1. The next season, despite not playing very often, he still managed to score 10 goals.

He then transferred to En Avant de Guingamp, hoping to get more playing time. At Guingamp, he scored 13 goals in 32 league games in his only season there.

He moved to FC Istres and, six months later, was loaned to Le Mans where he remained Brazilian striker Grafite's substitute.

in the summer 2006, he signed with Stade de Reims. He settled quickly and his numerous goals made him a fans' favourite.

After the club's failure to achieve promotion to Ligue 1, he announces he his departure for Le Havre, recently promoted to Ligue 1, in April 2008.

On 19 December 2008, Fauré returned to Reims. The club was relegated to third-tier National in May 2009. In his second stint at Reims, he achieved two promotions in three years. During the season 2009–10, he finished top scorer of National. Two years later, he became Ligue 2 top scorer for the second time, scoring 15 goals and helping the club from Champagne achieve promotion to Ligue 1, for the first time since 1979. Over the summer 2012, his contract expired and no agreement was found with the management of Reims.

Fauré returned to Guingamp, still in Ligue 2 at that time, for a second spell. The following season, he contributed 4 goals in 29 games to the promotion of the Breton club to the Ligue 1, which had been absent from the division since 2004. However, in the top-flight, he was excluded from a regular first-team place and on 31 January 2014, moved to Belgian side Sporting Charleroi on a six-month loan deal.

In summer 2015, Fauré joined another Belgian side, Union SG.

He retired in the summer 2017.

As a trainer 
In 2020, Cédric Fauré starts is career as a trainer in Haute-Garonne in AS Tournefeuille. 

In 2022, after a short period coaching FC Mulhouse in Alsace, He comes back in Belgium as head coach of Union Namur in Second Amateur Division (fourth-tier of Belgian football).

Honours
Toulouse
Ligue 2: 2003

Individual
Ligue 2 top scorer: 2003, 2012
National top scorer: 2010

References

External links 

1979 births
Living people
French footballers
Association football forwards
Toulouse FC players
En Avant Guingamp players
FC Istres players
Le Mans FC players
Stade de Reims players
Le Havre AC players
R. Charleroi S.C. players
Royale Union Saint-Gilloise players
Royal Antwerp F.C. players
Ligue 1 players
Ligue 2 players
Championnat National players
Belgian Pro League players
Challenger Pro League players
French expatriate footballers
Expatriate footballers in Belgium